Chrystian Amaral Barletta de Almeida (born 5 July 2001), known as Chrystian Barletta or just Chrystian, is a Brazilian professional footballer who plays as a forward for Corinthians.

Club career

Joinville
Born in Limeira, São Paulo, Chrystian began his career at SE Renovicente, and moved to Joinville in August 2016. He made his senior debut with the club on 9 October 2019, coming on as a second-half substitute and scoring his team's second in a 4–2 away loss against Avaí, for the year's Copa Santa Catarina.

In November 2019, Chrystian went on a trial at Sporting CP, but later returned to Joinville and appeared with the under-20 side in the 2020 Copa São Paulo de Futebol Júnior. Definitely promoted to the main squad on 20 January 2020, he featured sparingly before renewing his contract for two years on 31 December, and being immediately loaned to Bahia.

After mainly featuring for the under-23 team of Bahia, Chrystian returned to JEC on 1 June 2021, for the Série D. He then became a regular starter for the side, as they were knocked out in the round of 16 of the 2021 Série D, and narrowly avoided relegation in the 2022 Campeonato Catarinense.

São Bernardo
On 15 March 2022, Chrystian agreed to join Série B side Chapecoense; announced on 6 April, the deal was later revealed as a loan from São Bernardo, as his economic and federative rights were acquired by Elenko Sports, and he was subsequently assigned to São Bernardo. He regularly used for Chape during the 2022 Série B, as the club avoided relegation.

On 12 December 2022, Chrystian was announced by São Bernardo as an addition for the 2023 Campeonato Paulista. He impressed for the side during the tournament, scoring four times as the club reached the quarterfinals.

Corinthians
On 14 March 2023, São Bernardo announced the transfer of Chrystian to Corinthians.

Career statistics

Honours
Bahia
Copa do Nordeste: 2021

References

2001 births
Living people
People from Limeira
Footballers from São Paulo (state)
Brazilian footballers
Association football forwards
Campeonato Brasileiro Série B players
Campeonato Brasileiro Série D players
Joinville Esporte Clube players
Esporte Clube Bahia players
São Bernardo Futebol Clube players
Associação Chapecoense de Futebol players
Sport Club Corinthians Paulista players